Jeffrey John Jamar (born September 11, 1943, in Austin, Texas) is a retired Federal Bureau of Investigation (FBI) Special Agent in Charge (SAC), who was in charge of an FBI squad in the 1993 Waco siege. Jamar retired from the FBI in December 1994 after 25 years in service

1982 - Informant Coordinator at FBI headquarters
1990 - SAC for the FBI's Minneapolis field office
1993 - SAC for the FBI's San Antonio field office

On May 25, 1982, Jamar met with FBI agents Robert Fitzpatrick, Gerald Montanari, Robert McEleney, SAC Ed Enright, Randy Prillaman, Sean McWeeney, Joe Rush, and supervisors Ronald Reese and Anthony Amoroso, to discuss the Halloran/Wheeler murder. Jamar was involved because two FBI informants were being investigated on charges that they had been complicit in the murder. This perceived "bungling" was later mentioned in a civil suit alleging mass mismanagement of the Informant system.

Waco
Jamar served as the siege commander during Waco, aided by agents Bob Ricks, Richard Schwein, Richard Swensen and Richard Rogers.

He was charged as a defendant in the 1999 civil suit Andrade et al. vs Chojnacki et al.

References

Federal agents at Waco siege
Waco siege
Federal Bureau of Investigation agents
Living people
People from Austin, Texas
1943 births